Troy is a city in the U.S. state of New York and the county seat of Rensselaer County. The city is located on the western edge of Rensselaer County and on the eastern bank of the Hudson River. Troy has close ties to the nearby cities of Albany and Schenectady, forming a region popularly called the Capital District. The city is one of the three major centers for the Albany metropolitan statistical area, which has a population of 1,170,483. At the 2020 census, the population of Troy was 51,401. Troy's motto is Ilium fuit, Troja est, which means "Ilium was, Troy is".

Today, Troy is home to Rensselaer Polytechnic Institute, the oldest private engineering and technical university in the US, founded in 1824. It is also home to Emma Willard School, an all-girls high school started by Emma Willard, a women's education activist, who sought to create a school for girls equal to their male counterparts. Due to the confluence of major waterways and a geography that supported water power, the American industrial revolution took hold in this area, making Troy reputedly the fourth-wealthiest city in America around the turn of the 20th century. Troy, therefore, is noted for a wealth of Victorian architecture downtown and elaborate private homes in various neighborhoods. Several churches have a concentrated collection of stained-glass windows by Louis Comfort Tiffany. Troy is also home to the world-renowned Troy Music Hall, which dates from the 1870s and is said to have superb acoustics in a combination of restored and well-preserved performance space.

The area had long been occupied by the Mahican Indian tribe, but Dutch settlement began in the mid-17th century. The patroon, Kiliaen van Rensselaer, called the region Pafraets Dael, after his mother. The Dutch colony was conquered by the English in 1664, and in 1707, Derick van der Heyden purchased a farm near today's downtown area. In 1771, Abraham J. Lansing had his farm in today's Lansingburgh laid out into lots.  Sixteen years later, Van der Heyden's grandson Jacob had his extensive holdings surveyed and laid out into lots, naming the new village Vanderheyden.

In 1789, Troy adopted its present name following a vote of the people. Troy was incorporated as a town two years later, and extended east across the county to the Vermont line, including Petersburgh. In 1796, Troy became a village and in 1816, it became a city. Lansingburgh, to the north, became part of Troy in 1900.

History

1500 to 1700: the Mohican and the Skiwia Native Americans

Prior to the arrival of Europeans, the Mohican Indians had a number of settlements along the Hudson River near its confluence with the Mohawk River. The land comprising the Poesten Kill and Wynants Kill areas were owned by two Mohican groups. The land around the Poesten Kill was owned by Skiwias and was called Panhooseck. The area around the Wynants Kill, known as Paanpack, was owned by Peyhaunet. The land between the creeks, which makes up most of downtown and South Troy, was owned by Annape. South of the Wynants Kill and into present-day North Greenbush, the land was owned by Pachquolapiet. These parcels of land were sold to the Dutch between 1630 and 1657, and each purchase was overseen and signed by Skiwias, the sachem at the time. In total, more than 75 individual Mohicans were involved in deed signings in the 17th century.

1700: The Dutch and the British
The site of the city was a part of Rensselaerswyck, a patroonship created by Kiliaen van Rensselaer. Dirck Van der Heyden was one of the first settlers.

The 1800s: Canals, shipping, early industrialization
The name Troy (after the legendary city of Troy, made famous in Homer's Iliad) was adopted in 1789, before which it had been known as Ashley's Ferry, and the region was formed into the Town of Troy in 1791 from part of the Manor of Rensselaerswyck. The township included Brunswick and Grafton. Troy became a village in 1801 and was chartered as a city in 1816. In the post-Revolutionary War years, as central New York was first settled,  a strong trend to classical names existed, and Troy's naming fits the same pattern as the New York cities of Syracuse, Rome, Utica, Ithaca, and the towns of Sempronius and Manlius, and dozens of other classically named towns to the west of Troy.

Northern and Western New York was a theater of the War of 1812, and militia and regular army forces were led by Stephen Van Rensselaer of Troy. Quartermaster supplies were shipped through Troy. A local butcher and meatpacker named Samuel Wilson supplied the military, and according to an unprovable legend, barrels stamped "The U.S." were jokingly taken by the troops to stand for "Uncle Sam" meaning Wilson. Troy has since claimed to be the historical home of Uncle Sam.

On December 23, 1823, The Troy Sentinel was the first publisher of the world-famous Christmas poem "A Visit from St. Nicholas" (also known as "The Night Before Christmas" or "'Twas the Night Before Christmas"). The poem was published anonymously. Its author has long been believed to have been Clement Clarke Moore, but  is now regarded by a few to have been Henry Livingston, Jr. 

Scientific and technical proficiency was supported by the presence of Rensselaer Polytechnic Institute (RPI), one of the highest-ranked engineering schools in the country. RPI was originally sponsored by Stephen Van Rensselaer, one of the most prominent members of that family. RPI was founded in 1824, and eventually absorbed the campus of the short-lived, liberal arts-based Troy University, which closed in 1862 during the Civil War. Rensselaer founded RPI for the "application of science to the common purposes of life", and it is the oldest technological university in the English-speaking world. The institute is known for its success in the transfer of technology from the laboratory to the marketplace.

Through much of the 19th and into the early 20th century, Troy was one of the most prosperous cities in the United States. Prior to its rise as an industrial center, Troy was the transshipment point for meat and vegetables from Vermont, which were sent by the Hudson River to New York City. The trade was vastly increased after the construction of the Erie Canal, with its eastern terminus directly across the Hudson from Troy at Cohoes in 1825. Another artery constructed was the Champlain canal. In 1916, Troy Federal Lock opened as one of the first modern locks along the present-day canal system.

Troy has been nearly destroyed by fire three times. The Great Troy Fire of 1862 burnt down the W. & L. E. Gurley, Co. factory, which was later that year replaced by the new W. & L. E. Gurley Building, now a National Historic Landmark: Gurley & Sons remains a worldwide leader in precision instrumentation.

Troy's one-time great wealth was produced in the steel industry, with the first American Bessemer converter erected on the Wynantskill, a stream with  falls in a small valley at the south end of the city. The industry first used charcoal and iron ore from the Adirondacks. Later on, ore and coal from the Midwest were shipped on the Erie Canal to Troy and there processed before being sent on down the Hudson to New York City. The iron and steel were also used by the extensive federal arsenal across the Hudson at Watervliet, New York, then called West Troy. After the American Civil War, the steel production industry moved west to be closer to raw materials. The presence of iron and steel also made it possible for Troy to be an early site in the development of iron storefronts and steel structural supports in architecture, and some significant early examples remain in the city.

Troy was an early home of professional baseball and was the host of two major league teams. The first team to call Troy home was the Troy Haymakers, a National Association team in 1871 and 1872. One of their major players was Williams H. "Bill" Craver, a noted catcher and Civil War veteran, who also managed the team. Their last manager was Jimmy Wood, reckoned the first Canadian in professional baseball. The Troy Haymakers folded, and Troy had no team for seven seasons. Then, for four seasons, 1879 to 1882, Troy was home to the National League Troy Trojans. The Trojans were not competitive in the league, but they did field a young Dan Brouthers, who went on to become baseball's first great slugger.

In 1892, Robert Ross, a poll watcher, was shot dead (and his brother wounded) by operatives of Mayor Edward Murphy, later a U.S. Senator, after uncovering a man committing voter fraud. The convicted murderer, Bartholomew "Bat" Shea, was executed in 1896, although another man, John McGough, later admitted that he had actually been the shooter.

The initial emphasis on heavier industry later spawned a wide variety of highly engineered mechanical and scientific equipment. Troy was the home of W. & L. E. Gurley, Co., makers of precision instruments. Gurley's theodolites were used to survey much of the American West after the Civil War and were highly regarded until laser and digital technology eclipsed the telescope and compass technology in the 1970s. Bells manufactured by Troy's Meneely Bell Company ring all over the world.  Troy was also home to a manufacturer of racing shells that used impregnated paper in a process that presaged the later use of fiberglass, Kevlar, and carbon-fiber composites.

The 1900s: Industrialization, railroads, Rensselaer Polytechnic Institute
In 1900, Troy annexed Lansingburgh, a former town and village whose standing dates back prior to the War of Independence, in Rensselaer County. Lansingburgh is thus often referred to as "North Troy". However, prior to the annexation, that portion of Troy north of Division Street was called North Troy and the neighborhood south of Washington Park is referred to as South Troy. To avoid confusion with streets in Troy following the annexation, Lansingburgh's numbered streets were renamed: its 1st Street, 2nd Street, 3rd Street, etc., became North Troy's 101st Street, 102nd Street, 103rd Street, etc. Lansingburgh was home to the Lansingburgh Academy.

In the early 1900s, the New York Central Railroad was formed from earlier railroads and established its "Water Level Route" from New York City to Chicago, via Albany. A beaux-arts station was constructed c. 1903. A short New York Central branch from Rensselaer connected at Troy. Also serving the station was the Boston and Maine Railroad to/from Boston and the Delaware and Hudson Railroad to/from Canada. The railroads quickly made obsolete the 1800s-constructed canals along the Mohawk. The former NYC operates today as CSX for freight service and Amtrak for passenger service, the latter operating from Albany–Rensselaer station, directly opposite downtown Albany on the east side of the Hudson River. The end of rail passenger service to Troy occurred when the Boston and Maine dropped its Boston–Troy run in January, 1958. The Troy Union Station was demolished later in 1958.

In addition to the strong presence of the early American steel industry, Troy was also a manufacturing center for shirts, shirtwaists, collars, and cuffs. In 1825, a local resident, Hannah Lord Montague, was tired of cleaning her blacksmith husband's shirts. She cut off the collars of her husband's shirts since only the collar was soiled, bound the edges and attached strings to hold them in place. (This also allowed the collars and cuffs to be starched separately.) Montague's idea caught on and changed the fashion for American men's dress for a century. Her patented collars and cuffs were first manufactured by Maullin & Blanchard, which eventually was absorbed by Cluett, Peabody & Company. Cluett's "Arrow shirts" are still worn by men across the country. The large labor force required by the shirt manufacturing industry also produced in 1864 the nation's first female labor union, the Collar Laundry Union, founded in Troy by Kate Mullany. On February 23, 1864, 300 members of the union went on strike. After six days, the laundry owners gave in to their demands and raised wages 25%. Further developments arose in the industry, when in 1933, Sanford Cluett invented a process he called Sanforization, a process that shrinks cotton fabrics thoroughly and permanently. Cluett, Peabody's last main plant in Troy, was closed in the 1980s, but the industrial output of the plant had long been transferred to facilities in the South.

In 1906, the city supplied itself with water from a 33-inch riveted-steel main from the Tomhannock Reservoir. A 30-inch cast-iron main was added in 1914.

When the iron and steel industry moved westward to Pennsylvania around Pittsburgh to be closer to iron ore from Lake Erie and nearby coal and coke needed for the Bessemer process, and with a similar downturn in the collar industry, Troy's prosperity began to fade. After the passage of Prohibition, and given the strict control of Albany by the O'Connell political machine, Troy became a way station for an illegal alcohol trade from Canada to New York City. Likewise, the stricter control of morality laws in the neighboring New England states encouraged the development of openly operating speakeasies and brothels in Troy. Gangsters such as "Legs Diamond" conducted their business in Troy, giving the city a somewhat colorful reputation through World War II. A few of the buildings from that era have since been converted to fine restaurants, such as the former Old Daly Inn.

Kurt Vonnegut lived in Troy and the area, and many of his novels include mentions of "Ilium" (an alternate name for Troy) or surrounding locations. Vonnegut wrote Player Piano in 1952, based on his experiences working as a public relations writer at nearby General Electric. His 1963 novel, Cat's Cradle, was written in the city and is set in Ilium. His recurring main character, Kilgore Trout, is a resident of Cohoes, just across the Hudson River from Troy.

2000 to today
Like many old industrial cities, Troy has had to deal with the loss of its manufacturing base, loss of population and wealth to the suburbs, and to other parts of the country. This led to dilapidation and disinvestment until later efforts were made to preserve Troy's architectural and cultural past.

, Troy is updating its citywide comprehensive plan for the first time in more than 50 years. The two-year process is known as "Realize Troy" and was initiated by the Troy Redevelopment Foundation (with members from the Emma Willard School, RPI, Russell Sage College, and St. Peter's Health Partners). Urban Strategies Inc. (Toronto) is planning Troy's redevelopment.

Geography

Troy is located several miles north of Albany near the junction of the Erie and Champlain canals, via the Hudson River, and is the terminus of the New York Barge Canal. It is the distributing center for a large area.

The city is on the central part of the western border of Rensselaer County. The Hudson River makes up the western border of the city and the county's border with Albany County. The city borders within Rensselaer County, Schaghticoke to the north, Brunswick to the east, and North Greenbush to the south; to the west, the city borders the Albany County town of Colonie, the villages of Menands and Green Island, and the cities of Watervliet and Cohoes. To the northwest, Troy borders the Saratoga County village of Waterford within the town of Waterford.

The western edge of the city is flat along the river, and then steeply slopes to higher terrain to the east. The average elevation is 50 feet, with the highest elevation being 500 feet in the eastern part of the city. The city is longer than it is wide, with the southern part wider than the northern section of the city (the formerly separate city of Lansingburgh). Several kills (Dutch for creek) pass through Troy and empty into the Hudson. The Poesten Kill and Wynants Kill are the two largest, and both have several small lakes and waterfalls along their routes in the city. Several lakes and reservoirs are within the city, including Ida Lake, Burden Pond, Lansingburgh Reservoir, Bradley Lake, Smarts Pond, and Wright Lake.

Demographics

At the 2010 census,  50,129 people, 20,121 households and 10,947 families were residing in the city. The population density was 4,840.1 people/sq mi, with 23,474 housing units. The racial makeup of the city was 69.7%  White, 16.4% African American, 0.3% Native American, 3.4% Asian,  and 4.1% from two or more races. Hispanics or Latinos of any race were 7.9% of the population.

The median household income in 2013 was $37,805 (NY average of $57,369), and the median family income was $47,827 (NYS average of $70,485). The median per capita income for the city was $20,872 (NY average of $32,514). About 27.3% of the population were living in poverty as of 2013.

Since then, Troy's population size has increased to 51,401 with 19,899 households, taken from the 2020 census The racial makeup of the city increased in the percentage of African Americans to 17.5% whereas the number of White residents decreased to 63.5%. The rest of the population was reported to be 0.1% Native American, 4.8% Asian, 9.6% Latino or Hispanic, and 7.3% two or more races. The majority of Troy's population consists of women (51.4%) whereas males makeup the remaining 48.6%. Troy residents under the age of 5 were reported to be 5.2%, under the age of 18 were 19.6%, and 65 years and over were 11.4%. People with a disability, under age 65 years were 13.3% and those without health insurance (under age 65 years) was outlined to be 5.9%. The population of veterans in 2020 was 1,907 Troy locals, which coincided with those who had disabilities. The number of foreign born persons, between 2015 and 2019, was 8.0%.

Economically in 2020, the city's median household income had increased to $45,728 per family, with each family reporting to have 2.25 persons residing in them. The per capita income in past 12 months (in 2019 dollars), taken 2015–2019 was $25,689 with 24.4% of the population living in poverty. The poverty rate overall has decreased 3.3% since 2013.

The education rate of Troy locals, 25 years or more, with a high school graduate or higher is 86.8% whereas the amount of persons with a bachelor's degree or higher is 26.8%. Additionally, due to the increasing age of the internet, the percentage of households with a computer from 2015 to 2019 has increased to 88.5% and those with a broadband Internet subscription lies at 81.5%.

Religion
The city is also home to numerous churches (Orthodox, Catholic, and Protestant), three synagogues, and one mosque.

Economy

Troy is known as the "Collar City" due to its history in shirt, collar, and other textile production. Until the early 1990s, Troy was home to several textile manufacturers, including Cluett, Peabody, a subsidiary of the nation's largest publicly held textile manufacturer West Point-Pepperell Inc. The detachable collar was first established in Troy in 1820 by a Mrs. Montague. Her husband was a prominent blacksmith who complained to his wife that after coming home from work he had no clean white shirts for the next day. Mrs. Montague solved this problem by cutting collars off of her husbands shirts, and reattaching clean ones for him to wear when needed. This created the important industry of detachable collars and shirts in Troy. It also created the need for buttons, as a detachable collar often left gaps between the shirt and the collar, and buttons were used to snap collars in place. Other types of apparel invented in this time were Bishop collars, which were an upright modification of the turn-down collar, dickeys, detached shirt bosoms, and separate cuffs. This industry also gave rise to the laundry industry, when the first laundry store Troy Laundry was opened at 66 North Second St (Fifth Avenue today), and later on, the laundry industry in Troy would spark the creation of the first female union in the country. For close to a hundred years, Cluett, Peabody & Company was the largest industry in town, with a variety of products including detachable collars, arrow shirts, and other apparel. Around the early 20th century, Troy was responsible for making 90% of the collars worn in America. This was also the birthplace of the "white collar" social class, which was a more upscale working class community and the "blue collar" social class, which consisted of mostly factory workers. The industry had mostly died out by the 1960s, when most business had either gone out of business or moved south for cheaper land and labor costs.
At one point, Troy was also the second-largest producer of iron in the country, surpassed only by the city of Pittsburgh, Pennsylvania.

Troy, like many older industrial cities, has been battered by industrial decline and the migration of jobs to the suburbs. Nevertheless, the presence of RPI is helping Troy develop a small high-technology sector, particularly in video game development. The downtown core also has a smattering of advertising and architecture firms, and other creative businesses attracted by the area's distinctive architecture. Uncle Sam Atrium is an enclosed urban shopping mall, office space, and parking garage in downtown Troy. RPI is the city's largest private employer.

Arts and culture

Architecture

Troy is home to Victorian and Belle Époque architecture.

The Hudson and Mohawk Rivers play their part, as does the Erie Canal and its lesser tributary canal systems, and later the railroads that linked Troy to the rest of the Empire State, New York City to the south, and Utica, New York, Syracuse, New York, Rochester, New York, Buffalo, New York, and the myriad of emergent Great Lakes' cities in the burgeoning United States.

Notable buildings
 Rensselaer Polytechnic Institute
 The Emma Willard School for Girls aka Emma Willard School
 The Hart-Cluett Mansion
 Paine Mansion
 Russell Sage College
 Troy Public Library
 Hudson Valley Community College

Natives of Troy expressed their passion for building, using the following materials, for an array of building features:
 Iron: cast and structural iron works (facades, gates, railings, banisters, stairwells, rooftop crenellation, window grilles, etc.)
 Stone: carved hard and soft stone foundations, facades and decorative elements
 Glass: as well as in the vast array of ornate stained and etched glass works;
 Wood: fine wood work in found in many of Troy's buildings.

Tiffany and La Farge created magnificent stained-glass windows, transoms and other decorative stained-glass treatments for their customers in Troy. With many examples of intact 19th-century architecture, particularly in its Central Troy Historic District, this has helped to lure several major movies to film in Troy, including Ironweed, The Age of Innocence (filmed partially in the Paine mansion), Scent of a Woman, The Bostonians, The Emperor's Club, and The Time Machine. In addition, the television series The Gilded Age filmed in Troy. There are many buildings in a state of disrepair, but community groups and investors are restoring many of them.

Troy's downtown historic landmarks include Frear's Troy Cash Bazaar, constructed on a steel infrastructure clad in ornately carved white marble; the Corinthian Courthouse constructed of gray granite; the Troy Public Library, built in an elaborate Venetian palazzo style with high-relief carved white marble; the Troy Savings Bank Music Hall, designed in the Second Empire style, with a recital hall with highly regarded acoustic properties. There is a rich collection of Colonial, Federal, Italianate, Second Empire, Greek Revival, Egyptian Revival, Gothic Revival and other Romantic period townhouses surrounding the immediate downtown. The Hart-Cluett Mansion displays a Federal facade executed in white marble, quarried in Tuckahoe, New York. Often with foundations of rusticated granite block. Medina sandstone, a deep mud-red color, from Medina, New York, was also used.

As with many American cities, several city blocks in downtown Troy were razed during the 1970s as a part of an attempted urban renewal plan, which was never successfully executed, leaving still vacant areas in the vicinity of Federal Street. Today, however, there have since been much more successful efforts to save the remaining historic downtown structures.

Part of this effort has been the arrival of the "Antique District" on River Street downtown. Cafes and art galleries are calling the area home. As home to many art, literature, and music lovers, the city hosts many free shows during the summer, on River Street, in parks, and in cafes and coffee shops.

Notable landmarks

Recurring events
 Troy Flag Day parade – was the largest Flag Day parade in the US. It started in 1967 and ended in 2017.
 Troy River Fest – arts, crafts and music festival held every June in the downtown district.
 Uncle Sam Parade – was held near Samuel Wilson's birthday in mid-September. It was held last in 2015 after 40 years.
 Bakerloo Theatre Project – classical summer theatre
 The Victorian Stroll – held annually in December
 Troy Turkey Trot – Thanksgiving Day run; the oldest race in the Capital District.
 The Enchanted City – Steampunk festival in downtown Troy
 Troy Night Out – monthly arts and cultural event in the streets of Downtown Troy
 Rockin' on the River – outdoor concert series in June to August
 Troy Pig Out – BBQ competition in Riverfront Park
 Chowderfest – chowder festival in downtown Troy
 Troy Waterfront Farmers Market – held weekly, during the summer at Monument Square and River Street, and in the winter in the Atrium

Government

Executive branch
The executive branch consists of a mayor who serves as the chief executive officer of the city. The mayor is responsible for the proper administration of all city affairs placed in his/her charge as empowered by the city charter. The mayor enforces the laws of New York State as well as all local laws and ordinances passed by the city council. She or he exercises control over all executive departments of the city government, including the Departments of Finance, Law, Public Safety, Public Works, Public Utilities, and Parks and Recreation.

The mayor's term of office is four years, and an incumbent is prohibited from serving for more than two consecutive terms (eight years).

The current mayor of Troy is Patrick Madden (D), who is serving his second term, having been re-elected on November 5, 2019.

Electoral history
Results from the last seven mayoral elections (an asterisk indicates the incumbent):
 November 5, 2019 – Patrick Madden *(D, W) defeated Rodney Wiltshire (G, I), Tom Reale (R, C)
 November 3, 2015 – Patrick Madden (D) defeated Jim Gordon (R, C, G, I, RF), Rodney Wiltshire (W), Jack Cox (REV)
 November 8, 2011 – Lou Rosamilia (D, W) defeated Carmella Mantello (R, C, I)
 November 6, 2007 – Harry Tutunjian *(R, I, C) defeated James Conroy (D), Elda Abate (TPP)
 November 4, 2003 – Harry Tutunjian (R, I, C) defeated Frank LaPosta (D)
 November 2, 1999 – Mark Pattison *(D, L, W) defeated Carmella Mantello (R, I, C)
 November 7, 1995 – Mark Pattison (D, C) defeated Kathleen Jimino (R, RtL, Fre), Michael Petruska (I, W), Michael Rourke (L)
 prior to the November 1995 election, a city-manager form of government was utilized

Legislative branch
Troy's legislative branch consists of a city council composed of seven elected members: one at-large member who represents the entire city and acts as City Council President, and six district members who represent each of the six districts of Troy. Currently, there are 4 Democrats and 3 Republicans.

Each council member serves a two-year term and an incumbent is prohibited from serving for more than four consecutive terms (eight years).

The council meets on the first Thursday of every month at 7:00 pm in the City Hall council chambers. All meetings are open to the public and include a public forum period held before official business where residents can address the council on all matters directly pertaining to city government.

The current Troy City Council took office on January 1, 2022, and will serve until December 31, 2023.  The members are:

 Carmella Mantello (R – At-Large; President)
 Jim Gulli (R – District 1)
 Steven Figueroa (D – District 2)
 Sue Steele (D – District 3)
 Emily Menn (D – District 4)
 Kiani Conley-Wilson  (D – District 5)
 Irene Sorriento (R – District 6)

Political boundaries
The City of Troy is divided into thirty (30) election districts, also known as EDs. An ED is the finest granularity political district that can be used, from which all other political districts are formed.

Other political districts that make use of these EDs include City Council Districts, County Legislative Districts, State Assembly Districts, State Senate Districts, and U.S. Congressional Districts.

City Council districts
The 30 EDs are grouped into six Council Districts, as follows:
 Council District 1: ED1–ED6
 Council District 2: ED7–ED10
 Council District 3: ED11–ED15
 Council District 4: ED16–ED18
 Council District 5: ED19–ED24
 Council District 6: ED25–ED30

New York State Senate districts
Two New York State Senate Districts, the 43rd and the 44th, each share a portion of their total areas with groups of EDs in Troy as follows:
 New York's 43rd State Senate district: ED1–ED7
 New York's 44th State Senate district: ED8–ED30

New York State Assembly districts
Two New York State Assembly Districts, the 107th and the 108th, each share a portion of their total areas with groups of EDs in Troy as follows:
 Assembly District 107: ED1–ED8, ED12–ED15, ED23
 Assembly District 108: ED9–ED11, ED16–ED22, ED24–ED30

Other districts
All other political districts that exist in Troy consist of the entire city — all 30 EDs:
 U.S. Congressional District 20: ED1–ED30
 Rensselaer County Legislative District 1: ED1–ED30

Education
The Rensselaer School, which later became RPI, was founded in 1824 with funding from Stephen Van Rensselaer, a descendant of the founding patroon, Kiliaen. In 1821, Emma Willard founded the Troy Female Seminary. It was renamed Emma Willard School (America's first girls' high school and a high-academic boarding and day school) in 1895. The former Female Seminary was later reopened in 1916 as Russell Sage College (a comprehensive college for women). All of these institutions still exist today.

In addition, Troy is home to the 10,000-student Hudson Valley Community College (part of the State University of New York system); two public school districts (Troy and Lansingburgh); three private high schools: La Salle Institute (Catholic military-style), Emma Willard School, Catholic Central High School (a regional Catholic high school in Lansingburgh section), and one K-12 charter school system, Troy Prep.

Infrastructure

Transportation

Inter-city buses
Buses are operated by Capital District Transportation Authority.

Roads
US 4 runs north–south through the city. New York State Route 7 passes through, east–west through the city, with a bridge west across the Hudson River, as does New York State Route 2.

Rail
The New York Central Railroad, Delaware and Hudson Railroad, Rutland Railroad and  Boston and Maine Railroad provided passenger rail service to Troy. By the late 1950s, only the Boston & Maine passenger service remained. The last Boston and Maine passenger train arrived from Boston, Massachusetts in 1958.  Troy Union Station closed and was demolished later that year. Amtrak serves Albany-Rensselaer station, 8.5 miles to the south of Troy.

Fire Department 
Troy Fire Department's 119 uniformed personnel operate out of six fire stations located throughout the city and operate five engine companies, a rescue-engine company, two truck companies, three ambulances, a Hazardous Material response unit (Troy Fire Department is the hazardous material response unit for Rensselaer County) and two rescue boats.

Health care
Northeast Health is now the umbrella administration of Troy's two large hospitals (Samaritan Hospital and St. Mary's Hospital).

Notable people
 Joe Alaskey (1952–2016), voice actor, known for various Looney Tunes characters
 Dave Anderson (1929–2018), Pulitzer Prize-winning sportswriter for The New York Times, born in Troy
 David Baddiel (1964), comedian
 Garnet Douglass Baltimore (1859–1946), distinguished civil engineer and landscape designer, first African-American graduate of Rensselaer Polytechnic Institute
 Thomas Baker (1916–1944), U.S. infantryman, received Medal of Honor for Battle of Saipan
 James A. Barker, Wisconsin state senator
 George Packer Berry (1898–1986), Dean of Harvard Medical School, born in Troy
 Nick Brignola (1936–2002), musician (internationally famous jazz baritone saxophonist), was born in Troy and lived his whole life in the area.
 Dorothy Lavinia Brown (1919–2004), African American surgeon, legislator and teacher, raised in the Troy Orphan Asylum for much of her childhood and attended Troy High School, where she graduated at the top of her class in 1937.
Dan Bryant (1833–1875), stage name of Dan O'Brien (or possibly Dan O'Neill), co-founder of Bryant's Minstrels with his brothers Jerry and Neil.
Henry Burden (1791–1871), originally from Scotland, engineer and businessman who built an industrial complex in Troy called the Burden Iron Works that featured the most powerful water wheel in the world
 Hadden Clark, Cannibal child murderer and suspected serial killer; Born in Troy.
James Connolly (1868–1916), a leader of the Irish Easter Rising, lived in Troy 1903 – c. 1910; a statue of Connolly was erected in Troy in 1986
 Thomas H. Conway, Wisconsin State Assemblyman
 Charles Crocker, a railroad executive, a founder of the Central Pacific Railroad, and an associate of Leland Stanford
Jeff Daly, architect and designer, former head of design for the Metropolitan Museum of Art
Blanche Dayne, an actress in vaudeville from 1890s to 1920s
 Courken George Deukmejian Jr. (1928–2018), an American politician from the Republican Party who was the 35th Governor of California from 1983 to 1991 and Attorney General of California from 1979 to 1983
 Katharine DeWitt (1867–1963), an American nurse, writer and co-editor of the American Journal of Nursing.
 John Joseph Evers (1883–1947), baseball Hall of Fame second baseman
 Mame Faye (1866–1943), brothel mistress
 Robert Fuller (born 1933), actor, star of TV series Wagon Train, rancher, born in Troy
 Alice Fulton (born 1952), poet and author, MacArthur "Genius Grant" recipient, was born and raised in Troy; her novel The Nightingales of Troy follows a fictional Irish-American family through the 20th Century in Troy
 Henry Highland Garnet (1815–1882), African-American abolitionist, minister and orator; editor of The National Watchman and The Clarion
 Uri Gilbert (July 10, 1809 – June 17, 1888) 19th century mayor and alderman of Troy and owner of Gilbert Car Company.
 Abba Goddard (1819–1873), editor of The Trojan Sketchbook 
 Jay S. Hammond (1922–2005), fourth governor of Alaska from 1974 to 1982
 Benjamin Hanks (1755–1824), goldsmith and instrument maker
 Tim Hauser (1941–2014), singer and founding member of the vocal group The Manhattan Transfer
Edward Burton Hughes, the Deputy Superintendent of New York State Department of Public Works from 1952 to 1967
 Theodore Judah, a railroad engineer for the Central Pacific Railroad
 King Kelly (1857–1894), professional baseball player, born in Troy
Ida Pulis Lathrop (1859–1937), American painter, born in Troy.
 Dennis Mahoney (1974–), author, born in Troy
 William Marcy (1786–1857), governor, U.S. senator, U.S. Secretary of State
 Edward P. McCabe (1850–1920), African American settler, attorney and land agent, born in Troy
 Herman Melville (1819–1891), author (Moby Dick), from 1838 to 1847 resided in Lansingburgh
 John Morrissey (1831–1878), bare-knuckle boxer, U.S. representative, co-founder of Saratoga Race Course
 Kate Mullany (1845–1906), Irish-born labor organizer, founder of the Collar Laundry Union
 James Mullowney, Wisconsin State Assemblyman
Edward Murphy Jr. (1836–1911), mayor, U.S. senator
 Florence Nash (1888–1950), actress
 Mary Nash (1884–1976), actress
 Mary Louise Peebles (1833–1915), author of children's books
 Cicero Price (1805–1888), United States Navy commodore who fought in American Civil War and was commander of East India Squadron, resided in Troy for 36 years
 Don Rittner, Historian, author, film maker
 George G. Rockwood (1832–1911), celebrity photographer
 Richard Selzer (1928–2016), surgeon and author, was born in Troy; his memoir Down from Troy recounts his experiences there as the son of a physician
 Bernard Shir-Cliff (1924–2017), editor
 Kate Simmons (1850–1926), composer
 Jeanie Oliver Davidson Smith (1836–1925), poet, romancist
 Horatio Spafford (1828–1888), composer of the well-known Christian hymn "It Is Well With My Soul", was born in Lansingburgh (now Troy)
 Maureen Stapleton (1925–2006), Academy Award-winning actress of film, stage and television
 Lavinia Stoddard (1787–1820), poet, school founder
 John J. Taylor, U.S. Congressman
 Mike Valenti, radio commentator
 Joseph M. Warren, U.S. Representative for New York
 Amy Wax (born 1953), law professor
 Harriet Hilreth Weeks (1875–1939), Wisconsin state legislator
 Samuel Wilson (1766–1854), a butcher and meatpacker during War of 1812 whose name is believed to be the inspiration for the personification of the United States known as Uncle Sam
 Russell Wong (born 1963), actor
 Duke Zeibert (1910–1997), restaurateur
 Shaun Deeb (born 1986), poker player
 Charles Ganimian (1926–1988), Armenian American musician and oud player

Notes

References

Further reading

Rensselaer County histories

Troy histories

External links

 City of Troy Homepage
 Early history of Troy, NY
 Our Town: Troy  Documentary produced by WMHT (TV)
 

 
Cities in New York (state)
Former towns in New York (state)
Former villages in New York (state)
New York State Heritage Areas
Populated places established in 1787
Cities in Rensselaer County, New York
New York (state) populated places on the Hudson River
1787 establishments in New York (state)
Capital District (New York)